Three ships of the Soviet Navy and Russian Navy have been named for the city of Novorossiysk on the Black Sea:

  – a 
  – a Varshavyanka-class submarine

Russian Navy ship names